Marquis Jing of Jin, Ancestral name is Ji (姬), given name is Yijiu (宜臼), was the sixth ruler of the state of Jin during the Western Zhou Dynasty. After his father, Marquis Li of Jin died, he ascended the throne of Jin.

In 842 BC, the seventeenth year of the reign of Marquis Jing of Jin, King Li of Zhou was driven out of Haojing, then the capital of Zhou, because of his tyranny. Elder He of the Gong Lineage exercised royal power for fourteen years in a period known as the Gonghe Regency. Marquis Jing of Jin died the year after in 841 BC and his son, Situ, ascended the throne as the next ruler of Jin: Marquis Xi of Jin.

According to surname records, the Chinese surname Yangshe (羊舌) originated in the state of Jin. Marquis Jing of Jin's son, Boqiao (伯僑) has a grandson named Tu (突). During the time of Marquis Xian of Jin, Tu was given a land called Yangshe, modern Hongdong County and Qin County, Shanxi, by Marquis Xian of Jin. Therefore, Tu's clan name became Yangshe and this is where the surname Yangshe started.

References

Monarchs of Jin (Chinese state)
841 BC deaths
9th-century BC Chinese monarchs
Year of birth unknown